Kalugerovo is the name of three Bulgarian villages:

 Kalugerovo, Haskovo Province
 Kalugerovo, Pazardzhik Province
 Kalugerovo, Sofia Province